The Code Morin is a phrase used to refer to the text Procédures des assemblées délibérantes, first published in 1938 by Victor Morin.

The Code details procedures for organizational meetings, and was inspired by Robert's Rules of Order. It is the principal procedural code used in Quebec and in the francophone regions of New Brunswick. 

Many different aspects of the structure of meetings are discussed in the Code, including how topics are presented, how meetings are started, and how to calculate a quorum. It also details who can force a vote to be made, and who can present objections to the process of the meeting.

External links 

 
 
 
 

Parliamentary authority
Parliamentary procedure in Canada